The 1935 All-Ireland Senior Camogie Championship was the high point of the 1935 season in Camogie. The championship was won by Cork, who defeated Dublin by a single point margin in the final.

Structure
Antrim beat Derry 7–0 to 0–0 and Down 9–0 to 1–1 to win the Ulster championship. Cork beat Clare 10–0 to 1–5 and Tipperary 8–5 to 4–0 to win the Munster Championship. Galway beat Roscommon 2–1 to 1–1 and Mayo 4–2 to 1–1 to win the Connacht Championship, while Dublin beat Meath 5–2 to 3–1, Longford 11–3 to 0–0, reigning champions Louth 5–4 to 3–1 and Wexford 7–4 to 1–0 to win the Leinster Championship. The semi-finals were played together in Croke Park.

Final
St Aloysius School had won the Cork Senior Championship so 17-year-old Josie McGrath captained the team alongside schoolmate Kitty Buckley and Peggy Hogg a late withdrawal from the team. Jean Hannon scored an early Dublin goal but Cork led by two points at half time and had pulled ahead until two Dublin goals for Angela Egan set up an exciting finish.

The Irish Press reported,
Two worthier exponents of the code could not be found, and after one of the greatest games ever played, Cork retained their title. The pace was a cracker from start to finish and the exchanges were tremendously exciting, particularly in the second half. Despite the narrow margin there was little doubt about the Cork girls superiority. Territorially they were a good deal more of the play, and were it not for Dublin's grand defence in which Misses Gill, Egan and Kenny were the stars, Cork would have had a more substantial win.

Championship Results

Final stages

 
 Match Rules
50 minutes
Replay if scores level
Maximum of 3 substitutions

See also
 All-Ireland Senior Hurling Championship
 Wikipedia List of Camogie players
 National Camogie League
 Camogie All Stars Awards
 Ashbourne Cup

References

External links
 Camogie Association
 Historical reports of All Ireland finals
 All-Ireland Senior Camogie Championship: Roll of Honour
 Camogie on facebook
 Camogie on GAA Oral History Project

1935 in camogie
1935